5806 Archieroy, provisional designation , is a stony Hungaria asteroid from the inner regions of the asteroid belt, approximately 6 kilometers in diameter. It was discovered on 11 January 1986, by American astronomer Edward Bowell at Lowell's Anderson Mesa Station near Flagstaff, Arizona. It is named after Scottish astrophysicist Archie Roy.

Classification and orbit 

The bright E-type asteroid, alternatively classified as a V-type, is a member of the Hungaria family, which form the innermost dense concentration of asteroids in the Solar System. It orbits the Sun in the inner main-belt at a distance of 1.9–2.0 AU once every 2 years and 9 months (1,004 days). Its orbit has an eccentricity of 0.04 and an inclination of 21° with respect to the ecliptic. A first precovery was taken at Palomar Observatory in 1954, extending the asteroid's observation arc by 32 years prior to its official discovery observation at Anderson Mesa.

Lightcurve 

Between 2004 and 2015, several rotational lightcurves of Archieroy have been obtained from photometric observations by American astronomers Brian Warner at his Palmer Divide Observatory, Colorado, and Robert Stephens at the Center for Solar System Studies, California. Lightcurve analysis gave a well-defined rotation period between 12.16 and 12.187 hours with a high brightness variation of 0.34 to 0.47 magnitude.

Diameter and albedo 

According to the survey carried out by NASA's Wide-field Infrared Survey Explorer with its subsequent NEOWISE mission, Archieroy measures between 5.75 and 6.78 kilometers in diameter, and its surface has an albedo between 0.19 and 0.37, while the Collaborative Asteroid Lightcurve Link  assumes an albedo of 0.30 – a compromise value between 0.4 and 0.2, corresponding to the Hungaria asteroids both as family and orbital group – and calculates a diameter of 6.38 kilometers, with an absolute magnitude of 12.9.

Naming 

This minor planet was named after Scottish astrophysicist and celestial mechanician Archie Roy (1924–2012), who was a Fellow of the Royal Society of Edinburgh, the Royal Astronomical Society, and the British Interplanetary Society, as well as the president of the Society for Psychical Research and professor at Glasgow University. His research included the restricted and general three-body problems, high-order Taylor series and the long-term stability of and the orbital resonances in the Solar System. He has also authored and published several textbooks and novels. The approved naming citation was published by the Minor Planet Center on 19 October 1994.

Notes

References

External links 
 Lightcurve plot of 5806 Archieroy, Palmer Divide Observatory, B. D. Warner (2012)
 Lightcurve plot of 5806 Archieroy, Center for Solar System Studies (2015)
 Asteroid Lightcurve Database (LCDB), query form (info )
 Dictionary of Minor Planet Names, Google books
 Asteroids and comets rotation curves, CdR – Observatoire de Genève, Raoul Behrend
 Discovery Circumstances: Numbered Minor Planets (1)-(5000) – Minor Planet Center
 
 

005806
Discoveries by Edward L. G. Bowell
005806
Named minor planets
005806
005806
19860111